Juan Abreu may refer to:

Juan Abreu (outfielder) (1904–?), Cuban outfielder in the Negro leagues
Juan Abreu (pitcher) (born 1985),  Dominican former professional baseball pitcher